Miyagi Island or Miyagijima (宮城島, Japanese: Miyagi-jima, Okinawan: Naagushiku-jima) is an island located in the Yokatsu Islands of Okinawa Prefecture, Japan. It is also known as Takanaharijima (タカナハリジマ) in the Okinawan language, meaning "a high and distant island". This is a reference to its greater elevation compared to other nearby landmarks.

Miyagi Island is connected to the main Okinawa Island through a bridge that runs across Henza Island, making it accessible by car or bus. There are four villages on the island: Uehara (上原), Miyagi (宮城), Tōbaru (桃原) and Ikemi (池味).

History 
Along with the rest of the Yokatsu Islands, Miyagi was under the control of Chūzan during the Sanzan period. In 1429, Chūzan united the Okinawa Islands and formed the Ryukyu Kingdom. Under Ryukyuan rule, Miyagi Island was used as a place of exile for political criminals. In 1879, the Ryukyu Kingdom was annexed by the Japanese Empire, and control of Miyagi Island was transferred to Okinawa Prefecture.

At the end of World War II, Miyagi Island went under the control of the United States Civil Administration of the Ryukyu Islands, lasting from 1950 to 1972. It was returned to Japan following the Okinawa Reversion Agreement.

As evidenced by the ruins of Shigumu and Takamine, humans have inhabited the island since ancient times.

Climate

See also 

 Yokatsu Islands
 Katsuren Peninsula
 Okinawa Islands

References 

Yokatsu Islands